Scaeosopha betrokensis is a species of moth of the family Cosmopterigidae. It is found in Madagascar.

The wingspan is 17.5–20 mm. The forewings are greyish-yellow, diffused with leaden scales and with black spots. The hindwings are grey.

Etymology
The species name refers to Betroka, the type locality.

References

Moths described in 2012
Scaeosophinae